Mesoclanis dubia is a species of tephritid or fruit flies in the genus Mesoclanis of the family Tephritidae.

Distribution
South Africa.

References

Tephritinae
Insects described in 1853
Diptera of Africa